Ae Fond Kiss… (also known as Just a Kiss in some countries) is a 2004 romantic drama film directed by Ken Loach, and starring Atta Yaqub and Eva Birthistle. The title is taken from a Scottish song by Robert Burns, the complete line being "Ae Fond Kiss, and then we sever..."

The film explores the complications which ensue when second-generation Scottish Pakistani Casim (who is Muslim) and Roisin (a Catholic immigrant from Ireland) fall in love.

Plot
Set in Glasgow, the film tells the story of the Khan family. Casim is the only son of Pakistani Muslim immigrants to Scotland. He has a younger sister, Tahara, and an older sister Rukshana. Casim's parents, Tariq and Sadia, have arranged for him to marry his first cousin, Jasmine, and Casim is more or less happy with the arrangement. He then meets and falls in love with Roisin, an Irish Catholic immigrant (who is a part-time music teacher in Tahara's Catholic school). Roisin books a short holiday break for them both on seeing an advert in a travel agent's shop window, and while on holiday Casim tells her about the arranged marriage his family are planning for him. They then have to decide whether their love is strong enough to endure without the support of their respective communities.

At the same time, rebellious Tahara struggles to find herself between the bullying of some Scottish schoolmates and her Pakistani relatives. Meanwhile, Rukhsana loses her fiancé because Casim's new relationship shames the family. Roisin loses her job because the Catholic school's direction does not accept her relationship since she is a married – though separated – woman and because she and Casim are living together.

Roisin is finally moved by her hierarchy to a non-denominational school, Casim confronts his family, begging them to respect his choice before returning to her, while Tahara leaves to study Journalism at the University of Edinburgh against her parents' will.

Cast
Atta Yaqub	...	Casim Khan
Eva Birthistle	...	Roisin Hanlon
Ahmad Riaz	...	Tariq Khan
Shamshad Akhtar	...	Sadia Khan
Shabana Akhtar Bakhsh ...	Tahara Khan
Ghizala Avan	... Rukhsana Khan

Reception
On the review aggregator Rotten Tomatoes, Ae Fond Kiss received a rating of 88% certifying it as "Fresh", based upon 25 reviews. On Metacritic, the film had an average score of 65 out of 100, based on 7 reviews, indicating "generally favorable" reviews.

Accolades
Ae Fond Kiss received a number of nominations and awards.

2004
Won, Berlin International Film Festival – Prize of the Ecumenical Jury
Won: Berlin International Film Festival – Prize of the Guild of German Art House Cinemas
Nominated: Berlin International Film Festival – Golden Bear for Best Motion Picture
Nominated: British Independent Film Awards – Best Actress (Eva Birthistle), Best Screenplay (Paul Laverty), Most Promising Newcomer (Atta Yaqub)
Nominated: International Filmfest Emden – Emden Film Award
Won: European Film Awards – Best Screenwriter (Paul Laverty)
Won: Irish Film and Television Awards – IFTA Award for Best Actress (Eva Birthistle)
Won: Valladolid International Film Festival – Audience Award
Won: Valladolid International Film Festival – Golden Spike Award
Won: Motovun Film Festival – Propeller of Motovun

2005
Won: London Film Critics Circle – ALFS Award for Best Actress of the Year (Eva Birthistle)
Won: César Award – Best European Union Film (Meilleur film de l'Union Européenne)

See also
 Asian-Scots
British Pakistanis
New Scots

References

External links

 (includes trailer)

2004 films
2004 romantic drama films
2000s English-language films
2000s Punjabi-language films
British romantic drama films
British Pakistani films
Films about immigration
Films about interracial romance
Films scored by George Fenton
Films directed by Ken Loach
Films set in Glasgow
Icon Productions films
Warner Bros. films
English-language Scottish films
English-language Belgian films
English-language German films
English-language Italian films
English-language Spanish films
2000s British films
2000s Spanish films
2000s Italian films